The grey emutail (Bradypterus seebohmi), also known as the Madagascan grassbird or feather-tailed warbler, is an emutail in the family Locustellidae.
It is found only in Madagascar.
Its natural habitats are subtropical or tropical moist shrubland and shrub-dominated wetland.

The specific name seebohmi refers to Henry Seebohm.

References

grey emutail
Endemic birds of Madagascar
grey emutail
Taxonomy articles created by Polbot
Taxobox binomials not recognized by IUCN